Palestinian Medical Relief Society (P.M.R.S) a Palestinian non-governmental and non-profit organization, and one of the largest health NGOs in the State of Palestine. It was established in 1979 in the Palestinian territories by a group of volunteer medical cadres to provide medical and health services as a result of the deteriorating health situation due to the Israeli military occupation. The association's centers are spread over 490 locations spread over West Bank and Gaza Strip cities and villages and camps.

See also
 Palestine Red Crescent Society
 Health care in the Palestinian territories

References

External links

 P.M.R.S website

Palestinian charities
Organizations established in 1979 
Medical and health organizations based in the State of Palestine
1979 establishments in the Israeli Military Governorate
Emergency services in the State of Palestine